Mount Moturau is a mountain at height 1,497 m, rising south west of the Hope Arm of Lake Manapouri and clearly visible from Manapouri township. Note: Topographic map C44, Hunter Mountains, GR 2080950E 5497500N. Not named on official mapping pre 10 May 2001.

History 
The name Moturau was originally the Maori name for the summer village of what is now known as Manapouri. It is also the name of a tourist vessel on Lake Manapouri as well as a hut on the Kepler Track and was said to be an older name for Lake Manapouri itself.

References 
 New Zealand Geographic Board Database
 Herries Beattie: the Maoris and Fiordland page 58

Mountains of Fiordland